The Roman Catholic Archdiocese of San Antonio is an archdiocese of the Catholic Church in the United States, and sui juris Latin Church in full communion with the pope of Rome. It encompasses  in the U.S. state of Texas. The Roman Catholic Archdiocese of San Antonio had a self-reported 2018 population of 796,954, up from 728,001 in 2014. The archdiocese includes the city of San Antonio and the following counties: Val Verde, Edwards, Real, Kerr, Gillespie, Kendall, Comal, Guadalupe, Gonzales, Uvalde, Kinney, Medina, Bexar, Wilson, Karnes, Frio, Atascosa, Bandera County, and the portion of McMullen north of the Nueces River.

On August 28, 1874, the Roman Catholic Diocese of Galveston was divided and the northern territory was canonically erected by the Holy See as the Roman Catholic Diocese of San Antonio. Originally part of the Ecclesiastical Province of New Orleans, it was subsequently elevated on August 3, 1926, to a metropolitan archdiocese.

The archbishop of San Antonio also serves as the metropolitan of the ecclesiastical province of San Antonio with the Roman Catholic Archdiocese of San Antonio overseeing the following suffragan dioceses: Amarillo, Dallas, El Paso, Fort Worth, Laredo, Lubbock, and San Angelo. All of Texas' dioceses had been suffragan sees under San Antonio until December 2004 when Pope John Paul II created the new Ecclesiastical Province of Galveston-Houston and elevated the Archdiocese of Galveston-Houston to a metropolitan see.

History
The Roman Catholic Archdiocese of San Antonio was erected as a diocese on August 28, 1874, under the then Diocese of Galveston. It was elevated to an archdiocese on August 3, 1926.

In 2010, it had 138 parishes, 34 missions and two pastoral centers. In 2018, it reported 139 parishes, 5 hospitals, 3 health care centers, 3 orphanages, 16 nurseries, 10 high schools, and 30 elementary schools. With the appointment of Archbishop José Horacio Gómez as the Coadjutor Archbishop of Los Angeles, its cathedral was considered sede vacante until October 14, 2010. On October 14, 2010, Pope Benedict XVI appointed Gustavo Garcia-Siller as archbishop of the Roman Catholic Archdiocese of San Antonio.

On January 31, 2019, the Roman Catholic Archdiocese of San Antonio released a list of 56 Catholic clergy who were "credibly accused" of committing acts of sex abuse as early as 1940.

Bishops
The following are lists of ordinaries (bishops and archbishops of the diocese) and auxiliary bishops, and their years of service.  They are followed by other priests of this diocese who became bishops.

Bishops of San Antonio
 Anthony Dominic Ambrose Pellicer (1874–1880)
 John Claude Neraz (1881–1894)
 John Anthony Forest (1895–1911)
 John William Shaw (1911–1918; Coadjutor Bishop 1910-1911), appointed Archbishop of New Orleans
 Arthur Jerome Drossaerts (1918–1926), elevated to Archbishop

Archbishops of San Antonio
 Arthur Jerome Drossaerts (1926–1940)
 Robert Emmet Lucey (1941–1969)
 Francis James Furey (1969–1979)
 Patrick Fernández Flores (1979–2004)
 Jose Horacio Gómez Velasco (2004–2010), appointed Coadjutor Archbishop and later Archbishop of Los Angeles
 Gustavo Garcia-Siller, M.Sp.S. (2010–present)

Auxiliary Bishops
 Stephen Aloysius Leven (1955–1969), appointed Bishop of San Angelo
 Patrick Fernández Flores (1970–1978), appointed Bishop of El Paso and later Archbishop of San Antonio
 Hugo Mark Gerbermann, M.M. (1975–1982)
 Raymundo Joseph Peña (1976–1980), appointed Bishop of El Paso and later Bishop of Brownsville
 Charles Victor Grahmann (1981–1982), appointed Bishop of Victoria and later Bishop of Dallas
 Ricardo Ramirez, C.S.B (1981–1982), appointed Bishop of Las Cruces
 Bernard Ferdinand Popp (1983–1993)
 Edmond Carmody (1988–1992), appointed Bishop of Tyler and later Bishop of Corpus Christi
 Joseph Anthony Galante (1992–1994), appointed Bishop of Beaumont and later Coadjutor Bishop of Dallas and Bishop of Camden
 John Yanta (1994–1997), appointed Bishop of Amarillo
 Thomas Flanagan (1998–2005)
 Patrick Zurek (1998–2008), appointed Bishop of Amarillo
 Oscar Cantú (2008–2013), appointed Bishop of Las Cruces
 Michael Joseph Boulette (2017–present)
 Gary W. Janak (2021–present)

Other priests of this diocese who became bishops
 Mariano Simon Garriga, appointed Coadjutor Bishop in 1936 and later Bishop of Corpus Christi
 Sidney Matthew Metzger, appointed Auxiliary Bishop of Santa Fe in 1939 and later Coadjutor Bishop and Bishop of El Paso
 Laurence Julius FitzSimon, appointed Bishop of Amarillo in 1941
 John Louis Morkovsky, appointed Auxiliary Bishop of Amarillo in 1955, later Bishop of Amarillo, Coadjutor Bishop of Galveston-Houston, Bishop of Galveston-Houston
 Charles Edwin Herzig, appointed Bishop of Tyler in 1986
 Gerald Richard Barnes, appointed Auxiliary Bishop in 1992 and later Bishop of San Bernardino
 José Arturo Cepeda Escobedo, appointed Auxiliary Bishop of Detroit in 2011

Education

 Catholic Universities
 Our Lady of the Lake University
 St. Mary's University
 University of the Incarnate Word

High schools
 Antonian College Preparatory High School, Castle Hills (Est. 1964)
 Central Catholic Marianist High School, San Antonio (Est. 1852)
 Holy Cross of San Antonio, San Antonio (Est. 1957)
 Incarnate Word High School, San Antonio (Est. 1881)
 Our Lady of the Hills High School, Kerrville (Est. 2013)
 Providence High School, San Antonio (Est. 1951)
 St. Anthony Catholic High School, San Antonio (Est. 1903)
 St. Gerard Catholic High School, San Antonio (Est. 1927)
 John Paul II Catholic High School, Schertz (Est. 2009)

Former high schools
 St. Francis Academy - High school for girls
 St. Mary's School by the Riverwalk (1910–2004)

Province of San Antonio
See List of the Catholic bishops of the United States

See also

 Catholic Church by country
 Catholic Church in the United States
 Ecclesiastical Province of San Antonio
 Global organisation of the Catholic Church
 List of Roman Catholic archdioceses (by country and continent)
 List of Roman Catholic dioceses (alphabetical) (including archdioceses)
 List of Roman Catholic dioceses (structured view) (including archdioceses)
 List of the Catholic dioceses of the United States

References

External links
 Roman Catholic Archdiocese of San Antonio Official Site
 Roman Catholic Archdiocese of San Antonio Official Site (Archive)
 Archdiocese of San Antonio Schools
 Archdiocese of San Antonio (Archives)
 

 
Organizations based in San Antonio
San Antonio
San Antonio